Xenomigia concinna is a moth of the family Notodontidae. It is found in Colombia.

The length of the forewings is about 17 mm.

References

Moths described in 1911
Notodontidae of South America